The Revolutionary Military Council, sometimes called the Revolutionary War Council or  Revvoyensoviet, was the supreme military authority of Soviet Russia and later the Soviet Union. It was instituted on September 2, 1918 by decree of the All-Russian Central Executive Committee (VTsIK), known as the "Decree Declaring the Soviet Republic Military Camp".

Prior to Revvoyensoviet, the two main military authorities had been the Supreme Military Council and the operations division of the People's Commissariat on War and Navy Affairs.

The decree put all fronts and military organizations under the command of the chairman of Revvoyensoviet, with a commander-in-chief second-in-line to the chairman to lead strategic and military operations stateside.  The chairman was appointed by VTsIK on to serve as People's Commissar (or narkom) of War and Navy Affairs.

The first chairman of Revvoyensoviet was Leon Trotsky, with Latvian rifleman Jukums Vācietis as his commander-in-chief. Vācietis was replaced in July 1919 by Sergei Kamenev who served until 1924.

On November 30, 1918, the Council of Labour and Defense was created with the goal of mobilizing the country's resources towards defense. Headed by Lenin, the council consisted of the premier (Lenin), the chairman of Revvoyensoviet (Trotsky), a representative of VTsIK (Joseph Stalin), and several narkoms.

Revvoyensoviet was dissolved under the Soviet Union in 1934.

See also
Military Revolutionary Committee

References 

 Earl F. Ziemke: The Red Army 1918–1941: From Vanguard of World Revolution to US Ally. Frank Cass, New York 2004.

Military history of the Soviet Union
Military of the Soviet Union
1918 establishments in Russia
Military units and formations disestablished in 1934